Morocopo is a town in the Santos Michelena Municipality in the state of Aragua, Venezuela. Its population counts approximately 2,500.

Geography
Morocopo is surrounded by mountains. The shire town of Las Tejerías is located 12.5 km away.

Economy
There are several enterprises including broiler farms, pig farms, and vegetable producers.

Populated places in Aragua